The BAE Systems/Dassault Telemos was an unmanned military aircraft being jointly developed by BAE Systems and Dassault.

Development
The BAE Systems Mantis, which first flew in 2009, was being used as the basis of development. However, flying large UAVs in British airspace was a challenge.

A mockup of Telemos was unveiled at the Paris Air Show at Le Bourget in 2011; by this time BAE and Dassault were cooperating closely, with BAE in the lead role. There was not yet a formal joint requirement for the UAV from the French and British armed forces, but requirements were firming up, including round-the-clock ISTAR capability. Any acquisition would be influenced by EU competition law.

More agreements were planned at the Farnborough Airshow in 2012.

Telemos was expected to be a competitor with the EADS Talarion and American UAVs for a future order by the South Korean government. It could also have been a candidate for the Royal Air Force's "Scavenger" project.

There was an exclusive agreement between BAE Systems and Dassault; they would not cooperate with other partners to develop UAVs. Lacking serious rivals in the UK, this made the BAE/Dassault partnership much more likely to get contracts from the British government. The Telemos was likely to compete with the Talarion for various future European deals.

The Anglo-French Telemos programme was abandoned in July 2012, as the new French socialist government considered cooperating instead with other European partners on the EADS Talarion programme.

Design
Both turboprops and turbofans were considered for the initial design; the mockup shown at Le Bourget had turboprops, which would allow longer endurance at the cost of slower climbing.

See also

References

External links
 Photo of mockup Telemos

Medium-altitude long-endurance unmanned aerial vehicles
Telemos
International unmanned aerial vehicles
International proposed aircraft
BAE Systems Dassault Telemos
Telemos
Unmanned military aircraft of France